is a former Japanese footballer who last played for Fukushima United FC.

Club statistics
Updated to 2 February 2018.

References

External links

Profile at Fukushima United FC

1985 births
Living people
People from Ichihara, Chiba
University of Creation; Art, Music & Social Work alumni
Association football people from Chiba Prefecture
Japanese footballers
J3 League players
Japan Football League players
Fukushima United FC players
Arte Takasaki players
Association football goalkeepers